David Teviotdale (1870–1958) was a New Zealand farmer, bookseller, ethnological collector, archaeologist and museum director. He was born in Hyde, Central Otago, New Zealand in 1870. He donated over 4000 items of worked stone, bone and shell to the Otago Museum in 1924. In 1929 he began working at the Otago Museum, assisting the anthropology curator and continued his archaeological work at local Otago and national sites. His main interest was the material culture of early Māori settlers, particularly the moa hunters. His finds helped determine how many species of moa had lived in Otago.

References

1870 births
1958 deaths
New Zealand ethnologists
New Zealand archaeologists
New Zealand curators
People from Otago
New Zealand booksellers